Shiro, also called shiro wat, or tsebhi shiro, is a stew served for either lunch or dinner, originating from Ethiopia and Eritrea. An essential part of Eritrean and Ethiopian cuisine, its primary ingredient is powdered chickpeas or broad bean meal and often prepared with the addition of minced onions, garlic and, depending upon regional variation, ground ginger or chopped tomatoes and chili-peppers. Shiro is served atop injera (leavened flatbread) or kitcha (unleavened flatbread). Tegabino shiro is a type of shiro made from heavily spiced legume, chickpea, field pea, or fava bean, oil (or butter), and water. It is brought bubbling to the table in a miniature clay pot or shallow aluminum pan. It is often consumed with dark or sergegna injera.

Shiro can be cooked and added to shredded injera or taita and eaten with a spoon; this version is called shiro fit-fit. Shiro is a vegan food, but there are non-vegan variations that use niter kibbeh (a spiced, clarified butter) or meat (in which case it is called bozena shiro).

Shiro is a favorite dish during special occasions, including Tsom (Lent), Ramadan and other fasting seasons.

See also
 List of African dishes
 List of legume dishes
 List of stews

References

Ethiopian Millennium (electronic version, retrieved 19 June 2007)

Ethiopian cuisine
Legume dishes
Stews
Chickpea dishes
Eritrean cuisine